The 1899 Boston College football team was an American football team that represented Boston College as an independent during the 1899 college football season. Led by third-year head coach John Dunlop, Boston College compiled a record of 8–1–1.

Schedule

References

Boston College
Boston College Eagles football seasons
Boston College football
19th century in Boston